Neohesperilla xanthomera, the xanthomera skipper, is a butterfly of the family Hesperiidae. It is found in Australia in the Northern Territory, Queensland and New South Wales.

The wingspan is about 30 mm.

The larvae feed on Heteropogon.

External links
 Australian Caterpillars

Trapezitinae
Butterflies described in 1902